The 2005 San Jose State Spartans football team represented San Jose State University in the 2005 NCAA Division I-A football season. The team played their home games at Spartan Stadium in San Jose, California. They participated as members of the Western Athletic Conference. They were coached by head coach Dick Tomey.

Personnel

Coaching Staff

Roster

Schedule

Game summaries

Eastern Washington

at Illinois

at San Diego State

Nevada

at Utah State

at Boise State

Hawai'i

at Louisiana Tech

at No. 21 Fresno State

New Mexico State

Idaho

References

San Jose State
San Jose State Spartans football seasons
San Jose State Spartans football